Potanthus pava, commonly known as the Pava dart or yellow dart, is a butterfly belonging to the family Hesperiidae. It is found from southern India to central China, Taiwan, Malaysia, the Philippines, and Sulawesi, Indonesia.

References

Potanthus
Butterflies of Indochina
Butterflies of Asia
Butterflies of Indonesia
Butterflies of Malaysia
Lepidoptera of the Philippines
Insects of Taiwan
Butterflies described in 1911
Taxa named by Hans Fruhstorfer